Jean Baptiste François, comte de La Villéon, seigneur du Frescheclos (born 1740) was a French vice-admiral. He was member of the Order of Cincinnatus and knight of the ordre de Saint-Louis.

Career
 Garde de la Marine in 1755
 Captain of a navy vessel in 1781
 Contre-amiral in 1792
 Vice-amiral in 1814

Sources
 Christian de Jonquière, "Officiers de Marine aux Cincinnati", Ed. Poliphile 1988.

1740 births
19th-century deaths
French Navy admirals
People of New France
Knights of the Order of Saint Louis